The 1971 USC Trojans baseball team represented the University of Southern California in the 1971 NCAA University Division baseball season. The team was coached Rod Dedeaux in his 30th season.

The Trojans won the College World Series, defeating the Southern Illinois Salukis in the championship game, winning their second of five consecutive national championships, and third in four years.

Roster

Schedule 

! style="background:#FFCC00;color:#990000;"| Regular Season
|- 

|- align="center" bgcolor="ddffdd"
| February 24 || at  || 16–5 || 1–0 || –
|- align="center" bgcolor="#ffdddd"
| February 26 || at  || 5–6 || 1–1 || –
|- align="center" bgcolor="ddffdd"
| March 2 || at  || 13–10 || 2–1 || –
|- align="center" bgcolor="#ffdddd"
| March 5 || UC Santa Barbara || 5–6 || 2–2 || –
|- align="center" bgcolor="#ffdddd"
| March 6 || Cal Poly Pomona || 3–5 || 2–3 || –
|- align="center" bgcolor="#ddffdd"
| March 6 || Cal Poly Pomona || 9–3 || 3–3 || –
|- align="center" bgcolor="#ddffdd"
| March 9 ||  || 3–2 || 4–3 || –
|- align="center" bgcolor="#ffdddd"
| March 12 || at UC Irvine || 9–10 || 4–4 || –
|- align="center" bgcolor="ddffdd"
| March 13 ||  || 3–0 || 5–4 || –
|- align="center" bgcolor="ddffdd"
| March 13 || Loyola Marymount || 8–2 || 6–4 || –
|- align="center" bgcolor="ddffdd"
| March 16 || San Fernando Valley State || 1–0 || 7–4 || –
|- align="center" bgcolor="ffdddd"
| March 17 || at  || 6–7 || 7–5 || –
|- align="center" bgcolor="ddffdd"
| March 20 ||  || 8–4 || 8–5 || –
|- align="center" bgcolor="ddffdd"
| March 20 || BYU || 8–1 || 9–5 || –
|- align="center" bgcolor="ddffdd"
| March 23 ||  || 2–1 || 10–5 || –
|- align="center" bgcolor="ddffdd"
| March 24 ||  || 8–3 || 11–5 || –
|- align="center" bgcolor="ddffdd"
| March 26 ||  || 4–2 || 12–5 || –
|- align="center" bgcolor="ffdddd"
| March 27 || San Diego State || 1–3 || 12–6 || –
|- align="center" bgcolor="ddffdd"
| March 27 || San Diego State || 9–2 || 13–6 || –
|- align="center" bgcolor="ffdddd"
| March 31 ||  || 2–5 || 13–7 || –
|-

|- align="center" bgcolor="ddffdd"
| April 2 || at  || 6–1 || 14–7 || –
|- align="center" bgcolor="ddffdd"
| April 7 || at Hawaii || 8–0 || 15–7 || –
|- align="center" bgcolor="#ddffdd"
| April 13 || at  || 7–1 || 16–7 || 1–0
|- align="center" bgcolor="ddffdd"
| April 16 ||  || 10–1 || 17–7 || 2–0
|- align="center" bgcolor="ddffdd"
| April 17 ||  || 3–1 || 18–7 || 3–0
|- align="center" bgcolor="ddffdd"
| April 17 || Stanford || 8–4 || 19–7 || 4–0
|- align="center" bgcolor="ddffdd"
| April 20 || Chapman || 6–2 || 20–7 || –
|- align="center" bgcolor="ddffdd"
| April 23 || at Stanford || 2–1 || 21–7 || 5–0
|- align="center" bgcolor="ddffdd"
| April 24 || at California || 2–1 || 22–7 || 6–0
|- align="center" bgcolor="ddffdd"
| April 24 || at California || 10–0 || 23–7 || 7–0
|- align="center" bgcolor="ddffdd"
| April 27 ||  || 7–4 || 24–7 || –
|- align="center" bgcolor="ddffdd"
| April 30 ||  || 5–0 || 25–7 || 8–0
|- align="center" bgcolor="ddffdd"
| April 30 || Oregon || 2–0 || 26–7 || 9–0
|-

|- align="center" bgcolor="ddffdd"
| May 1 ||  || 10–4 || 27–7 || 10–0
|- align="center" bgcolor="ddffdd"
| May 1 || Oregon State || 9–6 || 28–7 || 11–0
|- align="center" bgcolor="ddffdd"
| May 3 || at  || 6–1 || 29–7 || –
|- align="center" bgcolor="ffdddd"
| May 4 || Long Beach State || 1–5 || 29–8 || –
|- align="center" bgcolor="ddffdd"
| May 7 || at  || 4–0 || 30–8 || 12–0
|- align="center" bgcolor="ddffdd"
| May 7 || at Washington State || 7–6 || 31–8 || 13–0
|- align="center" bgcolor="ddffdd"
| May 8 || at  || 6–0 || 32–8 || 14–0
|- align="center" bgcolor="ddffdd"
| May 8 || at Washington || 2–0 || 33–8 || 15–0
|- align="center" bgcolor="ddffdd"
| May 11 || Cal State Los Angeles || 4–2 || 34–8 || –
|- align="center" bgcolor="ddffdd"
| May 14 || UCLA || 1–0 || 35–8 || 16–0
|- align="center" bgcolor="ddffdd"
| May 15 || at UCLA || 6–3 || 36–8 || 17–0
|-

|-
! style="background:#FFCC00;color:#990000;"| Post–Season
|-

|- align="center" bgcolor="ddffdd"
| May 20 || vs. Oregon State || Buck Bailey Field || 6–2 || 37–8
|- align="center" bgcolor="ddffdd"
| May 21 || vs. Stanford || Buck Bailey Field || 9–3 || 38–8
|- align="center" bgcolor="ffdddd"
| May 22 || vs. Washington State || Buck Bailey Field || 5–10 || 38–9
|- align="center" bgcolor="ddffdd"
| May 22 || vs. Washington State || Buck Bailey Field || 6–3 || 39–9
|-

|- align="center" bgcolor="ffdddd"
| May 29 || vs. Santa Clara || Buck Shaw Stadium || 5–6 || 39–10
|- align="center" bgcolor="ddffdd"
| May 30 || vs. Santa Clara || Bovard Field || 5–1 || 40–10
|- align="center" bgcolor="ddffdd"
| May 30 || vs. Santa Clara || Bovard Field || 9–1 || 41–10
|-

|- align="center" bgcolor="ddffdd"
| June 12 || vs. Seton Hall || Rosenblatt Stadium || 5–1 || 42–10
|- align="center" bgcolor="ffdddd"
| June 13 || vs. Southern Illinois || Rosenblatt Stadium || 3–8 || 42–11
|- align="center" bgcolor="ddffdd"
| June 14 || vs. BYU || Rosenblatt Stadium || 8–6 || 43–11
|- align="center" bgcolor="ddffdd"
| June 15 || vs.  || Rosenblatt Stadium || 8–4 || 44–11
|- align="center" bgcolor="ddffdd"
| June 16 || vs. Tulsa || Rosenblatt Stadium || 3–2 || 45–11
|- align="center" bgcolor="ddffdd"
| June 17 || vs. Southern Illinois || Rosenblatt Stadium || 7–2 || 46–11
|-

Awards and honors 
Frank Alfano
 College World Series All-Tournament Team

George Ambrow
 All-Pacific-8 First Team

Mike Ball
 All-Pacific-8 First Team

Steve Busby
 All-America First Team
 All-Pacific-8 First Team

Fredd Lynn
 College World Series All-Tournament Team

Craig Perkins
 All-Pacific-8 First Team

Jeff Port
 All-Pacific-8 First Team

Mark Sogge
 College World Series All-Tournament Team
 All-Pacific-8 First Team

Tim Steele
 All-Pacific-8 First Team

Trojans in the 1971 MLB Draft 
The following members of the USC baseball program were drafted in the 1971 Major League Baseball Draft.

June regular draft

June secondary draft

References 

USC
USC Trojans baseball seasons
College World Series seasons
NCAA Division I Baseball Championship seasons
Pac-12 Conference baseball champion seasons
USC Trojans